Clue VCR Mystery Game is a 1985 VCR murder mystery game based on the board game Cluedo (also known as Clue). A sequel titled Clue II: Murder In Disguise VCR Game was released in 1987 with actors reprising their roles.

Plot and gameplay 
The game contained a 60 minute videotape of 3 separate stories and 18 individual games, 3 sets of clue cards, 18 investigation cards, and 10 suspect cards. The four new suspects Monsieur Brunette, Madame Rose, Sgt. Gray, and Miss Peach would later appear in the 1988 board game Clue Master Detective.

Critical reception and legacy 
The German localisation was cited my Modern Language Journal a potential learning package for students. Mel Magazine asserts that Clue VCR Mystery Game "not only represented a new way to play a familiar game", but "also ushered in a new type of gaming altogether". A 2013 documentary on the game entitled Who Did It? The Clue VCR Game was directed by Tim Labonte and Frank Durant.

Reviews
Jeux & Stratégie #52

References 

Cluedo